Baxtaçı is a rural locality (a derevnya) in Ätnä District, Tatarstan. The population was 51 as of 2010.

Geography 
 is located 18 km northwest of Olı Ätnä, district's administrative centre, and 116 km north of Qazan, republic's capital, by road.

History 
The village was established in the 16th century.

From 18th to the first half of the 19th centuries village's residents belonged to the social estate of state peasants.

By the beginning of the twentieth century, village had a mosque, a mekteb, 2 windmills, 2 manufactories and a small shop.

Before the creation of the Tatar ASSR in 1920 was a part of Çar Uyezd of Qazan Governorate. Since 1920 was a part of Arça Canton; after the creation of districts in Tatar ASSR (Tatarstan) in Tuqay (1930–1935), Tuqay (former Qızıl Yul) (1935–1963),  Arça (1963–1990) and Ätnä districts.

References

External links 
 

Rural localities in Atninsky District